John Edwards is a New Zealand lawyer and civil servant who is the UK Information Commissioner, and was previously the New Zealand Privacy Commissioner from 2014 to 2021.

Personal life and career 
Edwards was brought up in New Plymouth and practised law in Wellington for over 20 years specialising in information law. He also served as legal counsel for the New Zealand Families Commission from 2003 to 2013, and as a senior solicitor at the Ministry of Health from 1997 to 1999.

New Zealand Privacy Commissioner 
Edwards was the New Zealand Privacy Commissioner, first appointed in 2014 and held the post until 31 December 2021. During his tenure he was also chairman of the Global Privacy Assembly from 2014 to 2017.

UK Information Commissioner 
On 21 December 2021, Edwards was formally appointed by letters patent as the UK's sixth Information Commissioner, and took office on 3 January 2022.

References 

20th-century New Zealand lawyers
Living people
Year of birth missing (living people)